The Kingdom of Pergamon or Attalid kingdom was a Greek state during the Hellenistic period that ruled much of the Western part of Asia Minor from its capital city of Pergamon.  It was ruled by the Attalid dynasty.

The kingdom was a rump state that was created from the territory ruled by Lysimachus, a general of Alexander the Great.  Philetaerus, one of Lysimachus' lieutenants, rebelled and took the city of Pergamon and its environs with him; Lysimachus died soon after in 281 BC.  The new kingdom was initially in a vassal-like relationship of nominal fealty to the Seleucid Empire, but exercised considerable autonomy and soon became entirely independent.  It was a monarchy ruled by Philetaerus's extended family and their descendants.  It lasted around 150 years before being eventually absorbed by the Roman Republic during the period from 133–129 BC.

History 
Philetaerus was a lieutenant of Lysimachus who ruled a large state centered around Byzantium.  Philetaerus was trusted to manage the fortress of Pergamon and guard much of Lysimachus's treasury, and had 9,000 talents under his purview.  At some point prior to 281 BC, Philetaerus deserted Lysimachus and rebelled, allegedly over a dispute he had with Arsinoe, Lysimachus's wife.  In 281 BC, Seleucus I Nicator, another of Alexander's generals, defeated and killed Lysimachus at the Battle of Corupedium, although Seleucus himself was killed a few months later. Philetaerus offered his services to Seleucus and his successors of the Seleucid Empire, but enjoyed considerable autonomy.   He  extended his power and influence beyond just the city of Pergamon. He contributed troops, money and food to the city of Cyzicus, in Mysia, for its defence against the invading Gauls, thus gaining prestige and goodwill for him and his family. He built the temple of Demeter on the acropolis, the temple of Athena (Pergamon's patron deity), and Pergamon's first palace. He added considerably to the city's fortifications.

Philetaerus' nephew and adopted son Eumenes I succeeded him upon his death in 263 BC. He rebelled and defeated the Seleucid king Antiochus I Soter near the Lydian capital of Sardis in 261 BC. He freed Pergamon, and greatly increased its territories. He established garrisons, such as Philetaireia, in the north at the foot of Mount Ida, which was named after his adoptive father, and Attaleia, in the east, to the northeast of Thyatira near the sources of the river Lycus, which was named after his grandfather. He also extended his control to the south of the river Caïcus, reaching the Gulf of Cyme. He minted coins with the portrait of Philetaerus, who during his reign had still been depicting the Seleucid king Seleucus I Nicator on his coins.

Pausanias wrote that the greatest achievement of Attalus I was his defeat of the Gauls, by which he meant the Galatians, Celts who had migrated to central Asia Minor and established themselves as a major military power. Several years later the Galatians attacked Pergamon with the help of Antiochus Hierax, who rebelled against his brother Seleucus II Callinicus, the king of the Seleucid Empire and wanted to seize Anatolia and make it his independent kingdom. Attalus defeated the Gauls and Antiochus in the Battle of Aphrodisium and in a second battle in the east. He then fought Antiochus alone in a battle near Sardis and in the Battle of the Harpasus in Caria in 229 BC, after this Antiochus left to start a campaign in Mesopotamia and was killed in 226 BC. Thus Attalus gained control over Seleucid territories in Asia Minor north of the Taurus Mountains. He repulsed several attempts by Seleucus III Ceraunus, who had succeeded Seleucus II, to recover the lost territory.

In 223 BC, Seleucus III crossed the Taurus, but was assassinated. Achaeus assumed control of the army. Antiochus III the Great then made him governor of Seleucid territories north of the Taurus. Within two years Achaeus had recovered the lost territories and forced Attalus within the walls of Pergamon. However, he was accused of intending to revolt and to protect himself he proclaimed himself king.

In 218 BC, Achaeus undertook an expedition to Selge, south of the Taurus. Attalus recaptured his former territories with the help of some Thracian Gauls. Achaeus returned from his victorious campaign in 217 BC and hostilities between the two resumed. Attalus made an alliance with Antiochus III, who besieged Achaeus in Sardis in 214 BC. Antiochus captured the city and put Achaeus to death in the next year. Attalus regained control over his territories.

The Attalids became allies of Rome during the First Macedonian War (214–205 BC) and supported Rome in subsequent wars. Attalus I, who had helped the Romans in the first war, also provided them with assistance in the Second Macedonian War  (200–197 BC).

Eumenes II supported Rome in the Roman–Seleucid War (192–188 BC) and in the Third Macedonian War (171–168 BC)  In 188 BC, after the war against the Seleucids, the Romans seized the possessions of the defeated Antiochus III the Great in Asia Minor and gave Mysia, Lydia, Phrygia, and Pamphylia to the kingdom of Pergamon and Caria Lycia and Pisidia, in the southwestern corner of Asia Minor, to Rhodes, another Roman ally. Later the Romans gave these possessions of Rhodes to Pergamon.

Before he became king, Attalus II was a military commander. In 190 BC he took part in the Battle of Magnesia, which was the final victory of the Romans in the war against the Seleucids. In 189 BC he led the Pergamene troops which flanked the Roman Army under Gnaeus Manlius Vulso in the Galatian War.  In 182–179 BC, he was at war with Pharnaces I of Pontus. He won victories and gained some territory. He acceded to the throne in 159 BC. In 156–154 BC he made war against Prusias II of Bithynia with the help of the Romans. In 154 BC he was also assisted by Ariarathes V of Cappadocia, who provided troops led by his son Demetrius. Attalus expanded his kingdom and founded the cities of Philadelphia and Attalia. In 152 BC the two kings and Rome helped the pretender Alexander Balas to seize the Seleucid throne from Demetrius I Soter. In 149 BC, Attalus helped Nicomedes II Epiphanes to seize the Bithynian throne from his father Prusias II.

The last Attalid king, Attalus III died without issue and bequeathed the kingdom to the Roman Republic in 133 BC. The Romans were reluctant to take on territory in Asia Minor and did not take charge of the kingdom. Aristonicus, claimed to be the illegitimate son of Eumenes II, assumed the dynastic name of Eumenes III, claimed the throne, instigated a rebellion and in 132 BC "occupied Asia, which had been bequested to the Roman people and was supposed to be free". In 131 BC Rome sent an army against him which was defeated, however a second force defeated Eumemes III in 129 BC. They annexed the former kingdom of Pergamon, which became the Roman province of Asia.

In the interior of the Pergamon Altar there is a frieze depicting the life of Telephus, son of Herakles. The ruling dynasty associated Telephus with its city and used him to claim descent from the Olympians. Pergamon, having entered the Greek world much later than its counterparts to the west, could not boast the same divine heritage as older city-states and so had to cultivate its place in Greek mythology retroactively.

Territory

Dynasty of Pergamon

Philetaerus (282–263 BC)
Eumenes I (263–241 BC)
Attalus I Soter (241–197 BC)
Eumenes II (197–159 BC)
Attalus II Philadelphus (160–138 BC)
Attalus III (138–133 BC)
Eumenes III Aristonicus (pretender, 133–129 BC)

Attalid genealogy

Namesakes
 Attalea in Lydia, Roman city, former diocese and present Latin Catholic titular bishopric; now Yanantepe
 Attalea in Pamphylia, Roman city, former diocese and present Latin Catholic titular bishopric; now Antalya

See also

Macedonia (ancient kingdom)

Notes

Bibliography 
Allen, R. E., The Attalid kingdom, a constitutional history, Oxford University Press, 1983; 
Austin, M.M., The Hellenistic World from Alexander to the Roman Conquest:A Selection of Ancient Sources in Translation, "The Attalids of Pergamum", Cambridge University Press, 2006; 
Dignas B., "Rituals and the Construction of Identity in Attalid Pergamon" in Dignas B, Smith RRR, (eds), Historical and religious memory in the ancient world, Oxford University Press, 2012; 
Hansen, E. V., The Attalids of Pergamon (Study in Classical Philology). Cornell University Press, 2nd revised edition, 1972; ; . First edition, 1947; ASIN: B000MRG0T6
Kosmetatou, E., "The Attalids of Pergamon", in Erskine, A., A Companion to the Hellenistic World, Blackwell, new edition, 2005; 
Nelson, T.J. (2020) "Attalid aesthetics: the Pergamene ‘baroque’ reconsidered", Journal of Hellenic Studies 140: 176-198; https://doi.org/10.1017/S0075426920000087.
Welles, C. B., (ed.), Royal correspondence in the Hellenistic period: A study in Greek epigraphy, Ares Publishers Inc., U.S., 1974; 
Shipley (2000). The Greek World After Alexander, 323-30 BC(The Routledge History of the Ancient World), Routledge, first edition, 1999; ASIN: B017PNSW7M

External links 

 

 
States and territories established in the 3rd century BC
States and territories disestablished in the 2nd century BC
Dynasty genealogy
Former kingdoms